Yadollah Mortazavi (born March 21, 1958) is a professor of chemical engineering at the University of Tehran and is a leading researcher in the field of reaction engineering and heterogeneous catalysis.

References

Living people
1958 births
Academic staff of the University of Tehran
Shiraz University alumni
University of Waterloo alumni
Iranian chemical engineers